A pickpocket is a person who commits the act of pickpocketing.

Pickpocket, pickpockets or pick pocket may also refer to:

 , 1959 French film by Robert Bresson
 Pickpocket (EP), 1981 release by post-punk band Ludus
 , 2018 Colombian film
 , Indian film directed by J. Sasikumar
 , Indian film directed by G. M. Kumar
 , Indian film directed by Harnam Singh Rawail
 , Indian film directed by Ramesh Lakhanpal
 Xiao Wu, 1997 Chinese film